The Adjutant General's Corps is a corps in the British Army responsible for many of its general administrative services, named for the Adjutant-General to the Forces (now the Commander Home Command). As of 2002, the AGC had a staff of 7,000 people.

History
The corps was formed on 6 April 1992 through the amalgamation of several separate services:

 Army Legal Corps
 Corps of Royal Military Police
 Military Provost Staff Corps
 Royal Army Educational Corps
 Royal Army Pay Corps
 Women's Royal Army Corps
 Staff clerks from the Royal Army Ordnance Corps
   Clerks from the Royal Electrical and Mechanical Engineers.

In October 2022, to celebrate the Corps' 30th anniversary, a parade was held in Winchester, in the presence of The Duchess of Gloucester, Deputy Colonel in Chief.

Organisation 
The AGC is organised into the following branches:

Staff & Personnel Support (SPS) Branch
The SPS branch provides specialist HR, Finance, Accounting and ICT support to the British Army, during peacetime and on operations. Its personnel serve alongside and administer every unit in the British Army. The branch also provides clerical support to headquarters at all levels including various departments of the MOD Head Office in Whitehall and the Permanent Joint Headquarters (PJHQ) at Northwood working alongside counterparts in the Royal Navy and RAF, as well as in divisional and brigade headquarters and at unit and sub-unit level through Land Forces.  In addition to HR, administrative and clerical support, the SPS Branch also maintains the Army Welfare Service, where its small cohort of Army Welfare Workers - trained social and occupational welfare specialists - provide therapeutic support to Army personnel and their families.

In 2011, Gurkha clerks and administrative personnel who, up to that point, had served under the Royal Gurkha Rifles cap badge, were brought into a single unit titled the Gurkha Staff and Personnel Support Company (GSPS Coy). Following the traditions of the Queen's Gurkha Engineers, Queen's Gurkha Signals and the Queen's Own Gurkha Logistic Regiment, the GSPS Coy has a cap badge that combines elements of both its parent corps (the AGC) and the Brigade of Gurkhas, of which it is a constituent alongside the other Gurkha units in the British Army.

Provost (AGC Pro) Branch
The AGC Pro unifies two former services which, while no longer independent, retain their identities and cap badges. The Royal Military Police (RMP) is the Army's police force, while the Military Provost Staff (MPS) provides guards for military prisons. The newly formed Military Provost Guard Service (MPGS) is also part of this branch.

Educational Training and Services Branch
The ETS Branch has the responsibilities of the former Royal Army Educational Corps, it is an all officer branch with around 400 serving members. In 2006 the former RAEC cap badge of a 'fluted flambeau with five flames, with crown and scroll' was reintroduced, with 'ETS' replacing 'R.A.E.C.' on the scroll.

Army Legal Services
The ALS Branch provides legal advice to all levels of the Army. It retains the cap badge of the former Army Legal Corps. Prior to its amalgamation into the AGC, it was an independent corps in its own right. Its personnel are all qualified lawyers and commissioned officers.

CRHQ 
Almost all corps of the British Army contain a CRHQ (Central Reserve Headquarters) which oversee training for the corps along with controlling specialist units and formations.  The Adjutant General's Corps currently maintains two specialist pools:

 CRHQ Adjutant General's Corps Educational Training and Services Specialist Pool
 CRHQ Adjutant General's Corps Staff and Personnel Support Specialist Pool

Museum of the Adjutant General's Corps
The Museum of the Adjutant General's Corps is based at Peninsula Barracks in Winchester. It is one of several regimental museums that are part of Winchester's Military Museums.

References

External links
 Official site
 AGC (SPS Branch)
 AGC (ETS Branch)
 AGC Museum
 AGC Regimental Association
 AGC entry on the UK Armed Forces site

 
British administrative corps
Legal occupations in the military
Military units and formations established in 1992
1992 establishments in the United Kingdom